Burcott is a hamlet in the parish of Bierton with Broughton, Buckinghamshire, England.

Its name is a common one in England, and refers to a fortified cottage.  This is probably the stronghold referred to in the place name of Bierton.  Adversely Bierton is now the larger place while Burcott has hardly grown at all.

Today the hamlet has been completely swallowed up by the growth of Bierton village, though it is still marked on modern maps.  The playing field on which stands Bierton Scout hut marks the boundary between the village and the hamlet.

References

Hamlets in Buckinghamshire